The 2022 Tour de Suisse was a road cycling stage race that took place between 12 and 19 June 2022 in Switzerland and Liechtenstein. It was the 85th edition of the Tour de Suisse and the 22nd event of the 2022 UCI World Tour.

Teams 
All eighteen UCI WorldTeams are joined by three UCI ProTeams and the Swiss national team to make up the twenty-two teams that are participating in the race.

UCI WorldTeams

 
 
 
 
 
 
 
 
 
 
 
 
 
 
 
 
 
 

UCI ProTeams

 
 
 

National Teams

 Switzerland

Route

Stages

Stage 1 
12 June 2022 — Küsnacht to Küsnacht,

Stage 2 
13 June 2022 — Küsnacht to Aesch,

Stage 3 
14 June 2022 — Aesch to Grenchen,

Stage 4 
15 June 2022 — Grenchen to Brunnen,

Stage 5 
16 June 2022 — Ambrì to Novazzano,

Stage 6 
17 June 2022 — Locarno to Moosalp, 

The leader Alexandr Vlasov and several other riders did not start, as a result of a positive COVID-19 test.

Stage 7 
18 June 2022 — Ambrì to Malbun (Liechtenstein),

Stage 8 
19 June 2022 — Vaduz (Liechtenstein) to Vaduz (Liechtenstein),  (ITT)

Classification leadership table

Classification standings

General classification

Points classification

Mountains classification

Young rider classification

Team classification

Notes 

 As of 1 March 2022, the UCI announced that cyclists from Russia and Belarus would no longer compete under the name or flag of those respective countries due to the Russian invasion of Ukraine.

References 

2022
Tour de Suisse
Tour de Suisse
Tour de Suisse
Tour de Suisse
Tour de Suisse